2-Chloroquinoline is an organic compound with the formula ClC9H6N.  It is one of several isomeric chloro derivatives of the bicyclic heterocycle called quinoline.  A white solid, 2-chloroquinoline can be prepared from vinylaniline and phosgene.  It is a precursor to 2,2'-biquinoline.

References

Quinolines